Monique Ilboudo (born 1959) is an author and human rights activist from Burkina Faso.  As of 2012, she was Ambassador Extraordinary and Plenipotentiary of Burkina Faso to the Nordic and Baltic countries.

Career

Monique Ilboudo was born in Ouagadougou, Upper Volta, in 1959.
She studied law at the University of Ouagadougou, obtaining a bachelor's degree in 1982 and a master's degree  in Private Law in 1983.
She then studied at the Lille 2 University of Health and Law in France, gaining a diploma in advanced studies of private law in 1985.
She obtained a PhD in private law at the Paris XII University in 1991, and became an Assistant professor at the University of Ouagadougou.
Between 1992 and 1995, she was the author of the column "Féminin Pluriel" in the Burkinabé daily paper L'Observateur Paalga.  
At the same time, she established Qui-vive, observing the condition of Burkinabé women.  
She became a founding member of the Supreme Council of Information from 1995 to 2000.

Ilboudo was one of the women portrayed by Anne-Laure Folly in her 1994 documentary Femmes aux yeux ouverts (Women with open eyes). The title of the film is from a poem that Ilboudo reads, which says: 
"A respectable woman should learn from her husband, she shouldn't read, she shouldn't have her eyes open."
Ilboudo explains that in Burkina Faso, as in many African societies, men retain control over sexual relations. 
Procreation is the main factor, rather than love. Polygamy with the goal of reproduction and casual unprotected sex by the men exposes the women to a high risk of HIV/AIDS. 
Ilboudo summarizes the dilemma: "You can't take precautions to have kids!"

In 2000, Ilboudo was appointed Secretary of State for the Promotion of Human Rights.
In June 2002, she was appointed Minister for the Promotion of Human Rights, a newly created position. 
She has argued that poverty is a violation of human rights, and has said that it will be hard to overcome poverty until economic, social and cultural rights reach the same level as political and civil rights.

She was appointed Ambassador Extraordinary and Plenipotentiary of Burkina Faso to the Nordic and Baltic countries.
In April 2011, Burkina Faso established diplomatic relations with Latvia, and in October 2012 Ilboudo presented her credentials to Latvian President Andris Bērziņš.
The Burkina Faso ambassador's residence is in Denmark.

Author
Ilboudo has written many articles and several books, and is a major figure in Francophone African literature.
In addition to her "Féminin Pluriel" column, she often contributed articles to the weekly Le Regard.
In the preface to the third volume of collected articles from "Féminin Pluriel" she wrote:

Ilboudo received the national first prize for Best Novel with her 1992 Le Mal de Peau (The Ill of the Skin).
The book was republished in 2001. It tells the story of a Burkinabé woman who is raped by a white soldier, and a young woman who is born from the rape. The young woman travels to Paris in search of her father, and falls in love with a white man.  
The novel deals sensitively with subjects such as the colonial experience, prejudice and miscegenation.

Murekatete, a novel written as part of the project "Rwanda, writing as a duty of memory",  was published in 2001. 
Murekatete is the name of a woman, and means "let her live". The woman is haunted by memories of the Rwandan genocide.  Trying to overcome her complex and return to normal life, she and her husband visit the memorial site at Murambi. The move only makes the problem worse. The story is written in the first person, in few words.

In 2006, Ilboudo published Droit de cité, être femme au Burkina Faso (Freedom of the City, being a woman in Burkina Faso).

Bibliography

Gallery
Some pictures from a reception in Latvia in October 2012, with Inese Lībiņa-Egnere:

References

Citations

Sources

1959 births
Living people
Burkinabé women writers
Burkinabé lawyers
Burkinabé activists
Burkinabé human rights activists
University of Ouagadougou alumni
University of Paris alumni
Women lawyers
Ambassadors of Burkina Faso to Denmark
Ambassadors of Burkina Faso to Latvia
21st-century women writers
21st-century novelists
Burkinabé women ambassadors
Women columnists
21st-century Burkinabé people